Moz & Cat is a 2009 Indian psychological comedy-drama film written and directed by Fazil starring Dileep and Rahman in lead roles.

Cast 
Dileep as Moss D Samuel or Moz
Baby Niveditha as Tezzy or Cat
Aswathi Ashok as Nandana or Nandu
Rahman as Sumesh 
Siddique
Harisree Ashokan 
Sudheesh
Jaffer Idukki
Jagathy Sreekumar as Father Syriac
Anoop Chandran
Manoj K. Jayan as Panicker Das
Priyanka as toilet cleaner (cameo)

Soundtrack 
The film's soundtrack contains 7 songs, all composed by Ouseppachan and lyrics written by Kaithapram Damodaran Namboothiri.

Tracklist

Reception 

Sify.com wrote that "With a script that is full of flaws, the film is like a never ending journey. Fazil should call it day and retire gracefully, than making such stupid films. Our advice- Pick some of the old gems (DVD) of the director like Nokketha Doorathu Kannum Nattu, Ente Mamattikuttiyammaykku, Manivathoorile Ayiram Sivarathrikal or Aniyathi Pravu and re-live those fine memories . You will find it much more enjoyable than getting a migraine watching this film!" Paresh C Palicha from Rediff.com wrote" All seen and suffered; Fazil's Moz & Cat may just turn out to be the biggest disappointment of this festive season"
 Unni R Nair from Indian Express wrote "sadly enough, it turns out to be a damp squib. Dileep is his usual self as Moz, while Baby Nivedhitha is good as Tessy. Debutante Ashwathy is also good as Nandana. The rest of the cast are all strictly okay. Music, technical aspects etc jell with the theme and the mood, but it's the confusion about the overall mood that's to be mentioned. It's rather confusing and hence whatever is good about Moz And Cat is lost in this maze"

References

External links 
 

2009 films
2000s Malayalam-language films
Films scored by Ouseppachan